Qazipur is one of the 44 union councils, administrative subdivisions, of Haripur District in the Khyber Pakhtunkhwa province of Pakistan. Qazipur is located at 33°59'34N 72°36'11E and lies to the west of the district capital Haripur

References 

Union councils of Haripur District
Populated places in Haripur District